This is a list of women military historians. Traditionally an overwhelmingly male-dominated discipline, women began entering the field with the turn towards the 'new military history' of the 1960s. Pioneering women military historians included Joanna Bourke and Amanda Foreman, who contributed to re-orientating military history towards a "multidisciplinary approach that embeds war in its political, social, cultural and personal contexts". However, women remain under-represented in academic military history.

List

See also 
 List of military historians
 Women in the military

References

Lists of historians
Lists of women by occupation